The Battle of Dorking: Reminiscences of a Volunteer is an 1871 novella by George Tomkyns Chesney, starting the genre of invasion literature and an important precursor of science fiction. Written just after the Prussian victory in the Franco-Prussian War, it describes an invasion of Britain by a German-speaking country referred to in oblique terms as The Other Power or The Enemy.

Background 
Chesney was a captain in the Royal Engineers and had grown concerned over the ramshackle state of Britain's armed forces. He used fiction as a device to promote his views after letters and journalism on the issue had failed to impress public opinion. The Franco-Prussian War (1870–1871) had just demonstrated the speed, superiority and adaptability of the Prussian Army, which meant that Chesney's depiction of a fast-moving and determined invader hit a nerve.

Plot 

The story is told as a narrative by an unnamed veteran who participated in the Battle of Dorking. He is recounting the final days before and during the invasion of Britain. It is addressed to his grandchildren as an event fifty years earlier. Beginning sometime after an event similar to the Franco-Prussian War, concerns grow with the mobilisation of armed forces near the Netherlands. The Royal Navy is destroyed by a wonder-weapon ("fatal engines"), and an invasion force suddenly lands near Worthing, Sussex.

Demilitarisation and lack of training means that the army is forced to mobilise auxiliary units from the general public, led by ineffective and inexperienced officers. The two armies converge outside Dorking, Surrey, where the British line is cut through by the advancing enemy and the survivors on the British side are forced to flee.

The story ends with the conquest of Britain; the ransom the victors impose makes the country destitute (special comparison is made to France; likewise humiliated, but able to rise from the blow due to its wealth being in its fields and size, rather than colonies and business). The British Empire is broken up, with only Gibraltar and Malta being kept by the victorious Germans. Canada and the West Indies are ceded to the United States, and Australia, India and Ireland are all granted independence. Ireland enters a lengthy civil war as a result.

Publication history 

The Battle of Dorking was first published anonymously as a serial in the May 1871 Blackwood's Magazine and then in pamphlet form from the same publisher by the end of the month before finally appearing as a novel. It went through several editions and engaged the interest of soldiers and politicians, as well as the reading public.

It has appeared in a number of collections, including Michael Moorcock's Before Armageddon: An Anthology of Victorian and Edwardian Imaginative Fiction Published Before 1914 (1975).

The pamphlet is in the public domain worldwide, because the author died more than 100 years ago.

References

Sources

Further reading
 
 
  (Kirkwood notes that Surrey was also to be the scene of the invasion in H. G. Wells' science fiction novel, The War of the Worlds (1898), whose alien invaders landed near Woking.)

External links
 

1871 British novels
1871 science fiction novels
Novels first published in serial form
Military science fiction novels
Works originally published in Blackwood's Magazine
Novels set in Surrey
Fictional invasions of England
Lippincott, Grambo & Co. books
Dorking
Future history
Fiction set in the 1870s
Fiction set in the 1920s
British war novels
Fiction about invasions
Invasion literature
British novellas